Dehner is a surname. Notable people with the surname include:

Dorothy Dehner (1901–1994), American sculptor
Ernst Dehner (1889–1970), German Wehrmacht general
Jeremy Dehner (born 1987), American ice hockey player
John Dehner (1915–1992), American actor
Pick Dehner (1914–1987), American basketball player and coach

See also
Dehner Company, a footwear manufacturer based in Omaha, Nebraska